Beijing Subway Rolling Stock Equipment Co., Ltd., also known as the Beijing Subway Rolling Stock Factory is a subway rolling stock design, manufacture, assembly and maintenance facility in Beijing, China.  It was founded in 1960 and is a subsidiary of the Beijing Rail Transit Technology and Equipment Group Co. Ltd.   The factory provides local assemblage, maintenance and repair services for the Beijing Subway and Tianjin Metro.  The plant refurbished the DK16 and DK20 trains for the Beijing Subway.

See also
 Beijing Subway
 Beijing Subway Rolling Stock

References

External links

  

Beijing Subway
Tianjin Metro
Rolling stock manufacturers of China
Manufacturing companies based in Beijing